Patrick Antoine Edouard Chila (born 27 November 1969 in Ris-Orangis, Essonne) is a French table tennis player who has competed at five Olympics from 1992 to 2008.

He won a bronze medal with Jean-Philippe Gatien in doubles at the 2000 Olympics. He is also four-time champion of France (1998, 2003, 2007, 2008).

He announced his international retirement after his participation in the Beijing Olympic Games in 2008.

See also
 List of athletes with the most appearances at Olympic Games

References

External links

 
 
 
 
 
 

1969 births
Living people
People from Ris-Orangis
French male table tennis players
Olympic table tennis players of France
Table tennis players at the 1992 Summer Olympics
Table tennis players at the 1996 Summer Olympics
Table tennis players at the 2000 Summer Olympics
Table tennis players at the 2004 Summer Olympics
Table tennis players at the 2008 Summer Olympics
Olympic bronze medalists for France
Olympic medalists in table tennis
Sportspeople from Essonne
Medalists at the 2000 Summer Olympics